Justimus (also known as Justimusfilms) is a Finnish sketch comedy and musical trio consisting of Juho Nummela, Sami Harmaala and Joose Kääriäinen. Formed in 2009, Justimus first gained success with their videos on YouTube and in 2012 appeared on the similarly titled television series. In June 2014, their debut album Wunderboy peaked at number one on the Finnish Albums Chart.

Charts

Albums

Singles

References

External links
 

Finnish television sketch shows
Finnish musical groups